Kordan (also Romanized as Kordān and Kurdan) is a village in Chendar Rural District of Chendar District, Savojbolagh County, Alborz province, Iran. At the 2006 census, its population was 3,697 in 1,018 households. The latest census in 2016 counted 3,795 people in 1,150 households; it is the largest village in its rural district.

Historical and natural attractions 

Kordan mosque
 Kordan Police station
 Shahzade Hossein Shrine
 Sharbanoo Shrine
 Isar sport Complex
 Sangesoo mountain 
 Barekat Road
 Kordan Islamic council 
 Soleimani slaughter-house
 Kordan duct and river
 Horsemanship

Sports fields 
Mountaineering : Kordan area has suitable mountain connected from east to Talaghan and north to Karaj city. Sangeso is one of mountaineering team in Kordan village.

(horse) riding : It's the traditional sport in Kordan. athletes develop many sorts of horses. There are horse trading and horse keeping in horse riding club. There are more than 15 horse riding club in Kordan village.

Aviation : Mehr is first aviation club in Kordan village.

Religious attractions 
Imamzadeh Hossein (/huːˈseɪn/; Arabic: حُسَين Ḥusayn) : It was built in 10th century CE and is located in the Kordan cemetery. The shrine has a wooden door, the front of which is decorated with calligraphy.

Kordan Mosque : Not an old mosque. It has 2 out doors,1 elevator, and 2 indoors. Most pilgrims and mourners prepare food and give them to people in Ashura (Arabic: عاشوراء ʻĀshūrā') and Tasu'a events in that shrine.

Gallery

References 

Savojbolagh County

Districts of Alborz Province

Populated places in Alborz Province

Populated places in Savojbolagh County